Bryan Young (born August 6, 1986) is a Canadian-born South Korean ice hockey defenceman currently playing for Daemyung Killer Whales of the Asia League Ice Hockey. He was selected in the 5th round, 146th overall, in the 2004 NHL Entry Draft by the Edmonton Oilers.

Playing career
Born in Ennismore, Ontario, Young played in 186 games over four years with the Peterborough Petes of the Ontario Hockey League. He was not known for his offensive game, as he collected only 30 points over that span. Instead, he was regarded as a solid, stay-at-home defenceman.

Young opened the 2006–07 season playing for the Milwaukee Admirals of the American Hockey League, but due to the Oilers not having their own farm team, was soon sent down to the Stockton Thunder of the ECHL. When a space opened up with the Wilkes-Barre/Scranton Penguins, he was moved there.

Due to a rash of injuries, Young was called up to the Edmonton Oilers in March 2007.

To start the 2007–08 season, Young played for the Oilers new AHL affiliate, the Springfield Falcons.

A free agent at the conclusion of his entry-level contract in June, 2010, Young signed one-year-deal with High1 of Asia League Ice Hockey.

On January 21, 2014, Young became a naturalized citizen of South Korea.

Career statistics

Regular season and playoffs

International

References

External links

Bryan Young at Sportsnet.ca

1986 births
Living people
Canadian ice hockey defencemen
Daemyung Killer Whales players
Edmonton Oilers draft picks
Edmonton Oilers players
Ice hockey people from Ontario
Ice hockey players at the 2018 Winter Olympics
Milwaukee Admirals players
People from Peterborough County
Peterborough Petes (ice hockey) players
South Korean ice hockey defencemen
Canadian emigrants to South Korea
Springfield Falcons players
Stockton Thunder players
Wilkes-Barre/Scranton Penguins players
Asian Games silver medalists for South Korea
Medalists at the 2017 Asian Winter Games
Asian Games medalists in ice hockey
Ice hockey players at the 2017 Asian Winter Games
High1 players
Olympic ice hockey players of South Korea
Canadian expatriate ice hockey players in South Korea
Canadian expatriate ice hockey players in the United States
Naturalized citizens of South Korea